Ï, lowercase ï, is a symbol used in various languages written with the Latin alphabet; it can be read as the letter I with diaeresis, I-umlaut or I-trema.  

Initially in French and also in Afrikaans, Catalan, Dutch, Galician, Southern Sami, Welsh, and occasionally English,  is used when  follows another vowel and indicates hiatus in the pronunciation of such a word. It indicates that the two vowels are pronounced in separate syllables, rather than together as a diphthong or digraph. The letter is also used in the same context in Dutch, as in Oekraïne (Ukraine), and English naïve ( or ).

In German and Hungarian, ï or I-umlaut does not belong to the alphabet. 

In scholarly writing on Turkic languages,  is sometimes used to write the close back unrounded vowel , which, in the standard modern Turkish alphabet, is written as the dotless i . The back neutral vowel reconstructed in Proto-Mongolic is sometimes written .

In the transcription of Amazonian languages, ï is used to represent the high central vowel .

It is also a transliteration of the rune ᛇ.

Computing
Lowercase ï occurs in the sequence ï»¿, which is the Unicode byte order mark in UTF-8 misinterpreted as 
ISO-8859-1 or CP1252 (both common encodings in software configured for English-language users). Thus, it tends to indicate that any following mojibake can be corrected by reinterpreting the data as UTF-8.

See also
Umlaut (diacritic)
Yi (Cyrillic)

References

Latin letters with diacritics